Refuge is a 1923 American silent drama film directed by Victor Schertzinger and starring Katherine MacDonald, Hugh Thompson and J. Gunnis Davis.

Cast
 Katherine MacDonald as Nadia 
 Hugh Thompson as Gene 
 J. Gunnis Davis as Dick 
 J. Gordon Russell as Louis 
 Eric Mayne as General De Rannier 
 Arthur Edmund Carewe as Prince Ferdinand 
 Mathilde Brundage as Madame De Rannier 
 Fred Malatesta as Gustav Kenski 
 Grace Morse as Marie 
 Victor Potel as Alphpmse 
 Elita Proctor Otis as The Princess

References

Bibliography
 James Robert Parish & Michael R. Pitts. Film directors: a guide to their American films. Scarecrow Press, 1974.

External links
 

1923 films
1923 drama films
1920s English-language films
American silent feature films
Silent American drama films
Films directed by Victor Schertzinger
American black-and-white films
First National Pictures films
Preferred Pictures films
1920s American films